Anton Anatolyevich Shulepov (born 30 March 1996) is a Russian figure skater. He has won three international medals – silver at the 2015 CS Warsaw Cup, 2016 CS Tallinn Trophy, and 2016 International Cup of Nice.

Career
Shulepov trained in Vladimir Oblast until 2013 when he moved to Saint Petersburg, becoming a student of Evgeni Rukavicin. He ranked seventh at the 2015 Russian Championships.

2015–2016 season 
In the 2015–16 season, Shulepov placed 5th at the 2015 CS Ice Challenge. Later in the season he won his first ISU Challenger Series medal when he was a silver medalist at the 2015 CS Warsaw Cup. He was in the lead after the short program but eventually lost the gold medal to Alexander Samarin by 1.75 points. He finished 11th at the 2016 Russian Championships.

2016–2017 season 
In October Shulepov won the silver medal at the International Cup of Nice. In November he won another silver medal, now at the 2016 CS Tallinn Trophy. In December he placed eighth at the 2016 CS Golden Spin of Zagreb. He finished ninth at the 2017 Russian Championships.

2017–2018 season 
In October Shulepov placed ninth at the 2017 CS Minsk-Arena Ice Star. In December he finished ninth at the 2018 Russian Championships.

2018–2019 season 
In late November Shulepov competed at the 2018 CS Tallinn Trophy where he won the bronze medal with a personal best score of 230.30 points. One week later he finished seventh at the 2018 CS Golden Spin of Zagreb.  At the 2019 Russian Championships, he finished tenth.

2019–2020 season 
Shulepov placed eleventh out of eleven skaters at the 2019 Internationaux de France.  His choice of costume, half Holocaust victim and half Nazi guard, raised some eyebrows.

Competitive highlights 
CS: Challenger Series

Detailed results 
Small medals for short and free programs awarded only at ISU Championships.

Personal life 
In April 2019, Shulepov married figure skater Alena Leonova.

References

External links 
 

1996 births
Russian male single skaters
Living people
People from Vladimir, Russia
Competitors at the 2017 Winter Universiade
Sportspeople from Vladimir Oblast